Eurico Nicolau de Lima Neto (born 16 April 1994), simply known as Eurico, is a Brazilian footballer who plays as a defensive midfielder for Ipatinga, on loan from Cruzeiro.

References

External links

1994 births
Living people
Sportspeople from Minas Gerais
Brazilian footballers
Association football midfielders
Campeonato Brasileiro Série A players
Campeonato Brasileiro Série B players
Cruzeiro Esporte Clube players
Associação Atlética Ponte Preta players
Clube Náutico Capibaribe players
Botafogo Futebol Clube (SP) players
Tupi Football Club players
Ipatinga Futebol Clube players
Brazil youth international footballers
Footballers at the 2015 Pan American Games
Pan American Games bronze medalists for Brazil
Pan American Games medalists in football
Medalists at the 2015 Pan American Games